Claudia Coppola (born 4 December 1994) is an Italian retired tennis player.

Coppola has a career high WTA singles ranking of 688, achieved on 14 January 2019. She has a career high WTA doubles ranking of 509 achieved on 23 September 2013.

Coppola made her WTA main draw debut at the 2015 BGL Luxembourg Open in the doubles draw where she received a wildcard partnering Sílvia Soler Espinosa.

References

External links
 
 

1994 births
Living people
Italian female tennis players
20th-century Italian women
21st-century Italian women